Gleisi Helena Hoffmann ( or ; born 6 September 1965) is a Brazilian lawyer and politician. She was the Chief of Staff of Brazil from 8 June 2011 to 2 February 2014, during the presidency of Dilma Rousseff. Following her tenure as Chief of Staff, she became a Senator for Paraná and in 2017 became national president of the Workers' Party.

Biography
Gleisi Hoffmann began her involvement in politics in the student movement during her youth, becoming a Workers' Party' member in 1989. She graduated in law in the Centro Universitário Curitiba (Faculdade de Direito de Curitiba). 

Known for her public management skills, Hoffmann has served as state secretary in Mato Grosso do Sul and as municipal secretary in the city of Londrina.

She was a member of Luiz Inácio Lula da Silva's presidential transition team in 2002, and served as the financial director at the Itaipu Binacional hydroelectric dam from 2003 to 2006.

She ran for the Federal Senate of Brazil in 2006 and for the office of mayor of Curitiba in 2008, losing both elections. At the time, she was the president of PT in the state of Paraná.

In October 2010, Hoffmann was elected to the Senate, receiving over 3.1 million votes, the most voted senator from the state of Paraná and the first woman to hold the office. After four months in office, she was appointed Chief of Staff, the highest-ranking member of Brazil's Executive Office, by President Dilma Rousseff.

Hoffmann was accused of receiving R$1.000.000,00 of embezzlement money from Petrobras in her campaign to the Senate in 2010. In 2018, Hoffmann was cleared of charges in the Supreme Court.

Gleisi was married to the ex-Communications Minister Paulo Bernardo; they divorced in 2019. They have two children.

References

1965 births
Brazilian people of German descent
Brazilian women lawyers
Government ministers of Brazil
Living people
Members of the Federal Senate (Brazil)
Politicians from Curitiba
Presidents of the Workers' Party (Brazil)
Centro Universitário Curitiba alumni
Federal University of Technology – Paraná alumni
Women government ministers of Brazil
Chiefs of Staff of Brazil
20th-century Brazilian lawyers
Leaders of political parties in Brazil